The Ilumatobacteraceae are a family of Actinomycetota.

References 

Actinomycetota